is a passenger railway station located in the city of Higashimurayama, Tokyo, Japan, operated by the private railway operator Seibu Railway.

Lines
From Kumegawa, it takes 28–40 minutes to travel the 24.6 km to the Seibu-Shinjuku terminus in central Tokyo.

Station layout
The tracks at Kumegawa run east to west and there two opposed side platforms, serving two tracks, connected by a footbridge.

Platforms

History
The station opened on 16 April 1927.

Station numbering was introduced on all Seibu Railway lines during fiscal 2012, with Kumegawa Station becoming "SS20".

Passenger statistics
In fiscal 2019, the station was the 31st busiest on the Seibu network with an average of 32,638 passengers daily. 

The passenger figures for previous years are as shown below.

Surrounding area
Bus stops are located at the south exit to the station, along with numerous restaurants and a Seiyu department store. The north side of the station is currently under redevelopment and is due to be officially opened in March 2009, although part of this, a new underground cycle park, previously  opened on 1 June 2009.

See also
List of railway stations in Japan

References

External links

 Kumegawa Station information 

Railway stations in Tokyo
Railway stations in Japan opened in 1927
Seibu Shinjuku Line
Higashimurayama, Tokyo